St. Canisius is a former Roman Catholic church in the Hadern district of Munich, Germany. Designed by the Munich architect , the foundation stone was laid in 1925, and the church was consecrated on 29 August 1926 by Cardinal Faulhaber.

References

External links 
 St. Canisius – Cath. Parish Munich-Großhadern; accessed 5 November 2017.
 Photo spread of St Canisius' church, Hadern, Munich, danielnoha.de; accessed 5 November 2017.

Canisius
Cultural heritage monuments in Munich